Greater New Haven is the metropolitan area whose extent includes those towns in the U.S. state of Connecticut that share an economic, social, political, and historical focus on the city of New Haven. It occupies the south-central portion of the state, in a radius around New Haven. 

The region is known for its educational and economic connections to Yale University, oceanside recreation and the beach-community feel of the shoreline towns east of New Haven, and the trap rock landscapes stretching north from New Haven.

The New Haven metropolitan statistical area (MSA) is the set of municipalities containing the contiguous urbanized area centered on the city of New Haven. The MSA consists of the entirety of New Haven County with 27 towns. According to the U.S. Census Bureau, the New Haven MSA had a population of 861,113 in 2011. The New Haven MSA is also included in the wider region known as the New York Tri-State Area.

Definitions
There are several official definitions of Greater New Haven. There are thirteen towns that are included in all definitions. These are:
Bethany
Branford
East Haven
Guilford
Hamden
Madison
New Haven (central city)
Cheshire
North Haven
Orange
Wallingford
West Haven
Woodbridge

New Haven Service Delivery Area
A service delivery area is a geographical area within which employment and training services are provided under the Job Training Partnership Act. This definition contains 14 towns, with the town of Clinton added to the thirteen listed above.

South Central Region
The South Central Region is an officially designated region of Connecticut administered by a regional council of governments. The regional council carries out land use, infrastructure, and long-term economic planning for the member towns. This definition contains 15 towns and includes the towns/cities of Meriden and Milford, in addition to those listed above.

New Haven Labor Market Area
A labor market area, as defined by the U.S. Bureau of Labor Statistics, is an economically integrated area within which individuals can reside and find employment within a reasonable distance or can readily change employment without changing their place of residence. This definition contains 17 towns including the towns of Cheshire, Clinton, Killingworth, and Meriden.

New England City and Town Area
The New Haven NECTA is the set of towns containing the contiguous urbanized area centered on the city of New Haven, plus additional outlying towns that have a sufficient number of people commuting into the central towns. This definition includes 23 towns, adding the following ten towns: Chester, Cheshire, Clinton, Deep River, Durham, Essex, Killingworth, Meriden, Middlefield, Old Saybrook, and Westbrook. This definition includes a significant portion of the Lower Connecticut River Valley, which is not usually included in local definitions of Greater New Haven. As of the 2000 Census, the NECTA had a population of 571,310.

Metropolitan Statistical Area
The New Haven MSA is the set of counties containing the contiguous urbanized area centered on the city of New Haven. The MSA consists of the entirety of New Haven County with 27 towns. This definition, while consistent with national definitions of metropolitan areas, includes the city of Waterbury and its southern and eastern suburbs, which are not usually included in local definitions of Greater New Haven. According to the U.S. Census Bureau, the New Haven MSA had a population of 846,766 as of 2005. The New Haven MSA is also included in the New York–Newark–Bridgeport Combined Statistical Area.

Transportation

Rail
New Haven Union Station serves as the central point of rail service in Greater New Haven.

Metro North's New Haven Line serves New Haven State St and New Haven Union Station in downtown New Haven, West Haven as well as Milford. 

Shore Line East serves both New Haven stations plus Branford, Guilford, Madison, Clinton and Westbrook in the region, with service to Old Saybrook and New London as well as limited service to west of New Haven.

Both of Amtrak's Northeast Corridor services go through New Haven Union Station; most Acela Express and all Northeast Regional trains stop. Additionally, Amtrak's New Haven–Springfield Shuttle offers local service to Springfield, which is supplemented by the Hartford Line commuter service.

Bus
CTTransit serves the Greater New Haven area.

References

New Haven, Greater
Regions of Connecticut
Metropolitan areas of Connecticut
Geography of New Haven, Connecticut